William George Greene  was Dean of Lismore from 1919 until 1930.

He was educated at Trinity College Dublin and ordained in 1904. He began his ecclesiastical career with a curacy at Fiddown. He was Rector of Kilmeadan then Rural Dean of  Waterford.

References

Alumni of Trinity College Dublin
Deans of Lismore
1930 deaths
Year of birth missing